El Asira is the first Muslim sex shop, where marketing, language, and products are Shariah compliant. There are no nude male or female photos on the site. It was founded by Abdelaziz Aouragh in 2010. It received 70,000 hits during the first day, disabling the site temporarily. The company ships products to over 30 countries. The company hopes to expand public opinion of Islam and sexuality.

References

Sex shops
Retail companies established in 2010
Internet properties established in 2010
Companies of the Netherlands
Sexuality in Islam